Wauconda ( or ) is a village in Lake County, Illinois, United States. Per the 2020 census, the population was 14,084. It is the site of the Wauconda Bog Nature Preserve, a National Natural Landmark. Wauconda Community Unit School District 118  serves students from Pre-K through 12th grade who live in Wauconda and surrounding communities (Island Lake, Lakemoor, Volo, and unincorporated sections of McHenry County). Fremont School District 79 also serves students from communities from northern part of Wauconda.

Government
Wauconda's local government consists of a Mayor, Clerk, and six-member Board of Trustees who are elected to four-year overlapping terms of office.  Village Board meetings are held on the first and third Tuesday of the month.  Committee of the Whole meetings are held the second, fourth and sometimes fifth Tuesday of the month.

The Village Administrator oversees all village departments and serves as a liaison between the village residents and the Board.  The Administrator supervises the daily operations of the village with the assistance of staff, including the Chief of Police and the directors of Public Works, Finance, Human Resources/Risk Management, Information Technology, Environmental Quality, Building and Zoning, and Economic Development.

Fire/Rescue is provided by the Wauconda Fire Protection District, an independent taxing body covering all of the Village of Wauconda and all or parts of 8 other communities and unincorporated parts of Lake and McHenry Counties.

There is a library on Main Street, called Wauconda Area Library, which serves the village.

History
According to local legend, Wauconda was named after an indigenous chief whose name translated as "spirit water". 

“Waconda,” it says in the Otoe language, Great Mystery, meaning that vital thing or phenomenon in life that cannot ever be entirely comprehensible to us. What is understood though, through the spoken word, is that silence is also Waconda, as is the universe and everything that exists, tangible and intangible, because none of these things are separate from that life force. It is all Waconda. . . .”
[Anna Lee Walters, Talking Indian: Reflections on Survival and Writing (Ithaca, N.Y.: Firebrand Books, 1992), 19–20.]

Many early settlers of Wauconda came from New England and New York by covered wagon or through the Erie Canal and the Great Lakes.

Elihu Hubbard built the first log cabin on the bank of Bangs Lake in 1836. Justus Bangs, the first settler in Wauconda, built a house next to the lake in 1848 and the lake was later named after him. In 1840, members of the Winnebago tribe who did not leave the shores of the Fox River often went to the area to trade. In 1849, Wauconda was formally organized and the first town meeting was held in April 1850 on the first Tuesday.

Wauconda's first school was built in 1839 and the area's post office was moved to Wauconda on June 27, 1849, with Hazard Green becoming its first postmaster.

Elder Joel Wheeler of McHenry built the first Baptist church in Wauconda in the autumn of 1838. A Methodist church was organized on September 3, 1852, by Reverend C. French, and built in 1856 on the Commons. Both Methodists and Baptists attended prayer at the church until February 1870, when the Baptists reorganized and built a new church on October 30, 1870. A Roman Catholic church was built in 1877 and its first trustees were James S. Murray, Charles Davlin, Felix Givens, John Givens, Hugh Davlin, and Owen McMahon. Its first priest was Father O'Neil.

In 1850, Wauconda had a population of around 200 residents, and the town had three goods stores, two public houses and various mechanics.

Geography
Wauconda is located at  (42.266910, -88.142657).

Transportation
Route 12 (north to south), IL 176 (west to east), and IL 59 serve as important roads for the village connecting its surrounding area.

Demographics

2020 census

Note: the US Census treats Hispanic/Latino as an ethnic category. This table excludes Latinos from the racial categories and assigns them to a separate category. Hispanics/Latinos can be of any race.

2000 Census
As of the census of 2000, there were 9,448 people, 3,611 households, and 2,404 families residing in the village. The racial makeup of the village was 90.2% White, 0.4% African American, 0.3% Native American, 1.8% Asian, 0.0% Pacific Islander, 6.4% from other races, and 0.9% from two or more races. 11.9% of the population reported being Latino of any race.

There were 3,611 households, out of which 100% had children under the age of 18 living with them, 54.2% were married couples living together, 8.3% had a female householder with no husband present, and 33.4% were non-families. 27.4% of all households were made up of individuals, and 9.4% had someone living alone who was 65 years of age or older. The average household size was 2.58 and the average family size was 3.16.

In the village, the population was spread out, with 25.1% under the age of 18, 7.2% from 18 to 24, 35.8% from 25 to 44, 20.5% from 45 to 64, and 11.4% who were 65 years of age or older. The median age was 36 years. For every 100 females, there were 101.9 males. For every 100 females age 18 and over, there were 98.1 males.

The median income for a household in the village was $65,805, and the median income for a family was $56,576. Males had a median income of $64,027 versus $43,125 for females. The per capita income for the village was $40,355. About 2.1% of families and 4.0% of the population were below the poverty line, including 2.1% of those under age 18 and 4.0% of those age 65 or over.

Events

On January 28, 2005, over 2,900 people participated in a snowball fight for ten minutes, setting a new world record for the most participants in such an event.

In popular culture 
 The Blues Brothers was partially filmed in the village.  A segment of the chase scene during the final third of the film featured the US-12 highway overpass over IL-176 (Liberty St.), as was a scene with the Blues Brothers driving onto Phil's Beach on North Main Street.
In 2018, the village began to receive prank phone calls with the release of the superhero film Black Panther. This was because, in the film, the homophonous ancestral country Wakanda serves as the primary setting.

References

Sources
 http://www.illinois.com/details/city.php?cityFips=1779267
 https://www.wauconda-il.gov/

External links
Village of Wauconda
Wauconda Area Chamber of Commerce

Villages in Illinois
Villages in Lake County, Illinois
Populated places established in 1849
1849 establishments in Illinois